US Tours Rugby is a French rugby union club that currently competes in the fourth division of French club rugby, the Fédérale 2 competition. US Tours previously competed in the higher divisions, being relegated from Rugby Pro D2 after the 2001-02 season. The club was formed in 1898 and plays in orange (tango) and blue.

See also
 List of rugby union clubs in France

External links
Official website

Tours